Aeromonas media is a species of bacteria. RM (= ATCC 33907) is the type strain of this species.

Description
It is Gram-negative and motile, and its rod-shaped cells are about 1 by 2 µm with rounded ends. Its metabolism is fermentative, and it produces catalase, oxidase, and arginine dihydrolase. It is susceptible to chlortetracycline, colistin sulfate, furazolidone, gentamicin, neomycin, nitrofurantoin, and tetracycline, but not to ampicillin, cloxacillin, novobiocin, or sulfafurazole.

It produces a bacteriocin-like inhibitory substance.

References

Further reading
Review about the genus:

External links
 Aeromonas J.P. Euzéby: List of Prokaryotic names with Standing in Nomenclature
Type strain of Aeromonas media at BacDive -  the Bacterial Diversity Metadatabase

Aeromonadales
Bacteria described in 1983